Bird cliffs, or nesting cliffs, are steep cliffs with numerous small shelves which serve as nesting locations for bird colonies. Bird cliffs are found on islands in the North Atlantic and Arctic, such as the Faroe Islands, Iceland, the Svalbard archipelago and on islands off Northern Norway. Among species that nest in large numbers on bird cliffs are common murre, thick-billed murre, razorbill, kittiwake, little auk and Atlantic puffin. The number of breeding couples may exhibit large variations depending on available food. Bird cliffs have often been exploited as a food resource by the local population, as well as being used by hunters and egg collectors.

Gallery

References

Bird breeding
Cliffs